Overseas Chinese-focused banks excelled in commerce, finance, and many other industries. While catering to Chinese immigrants in foreign countries, these banks are not controlled by the Chinese government, nor do they have any ties with the Chinese government. 

These independent banks were originally to remit money back to China but now they cater to the people of their adopted countries. These overseas Chinese banks contributed to a large extent to the development of the countries and communities in which they were located. Overseas Chinese banks normally refer to Chinese banks outside China (including Hong Kong and Macau).

Southeast Asia
The Overseas Chinese banks are mostly situated in Southeast Asia where the local overseas Chinese population plays a significant if not dominant role in the local economy.

Indonesia
Bank Buana (Part of United Overseas Bank)
Lippo Banking Group
Panin Bank (No.11 Overseas Chinese Bank)
NISP Bank (Part of Oversea-Chinese Banking Corporation)

Singapore
United Overseas Bank (No.1 Overseas Chinese Bank)
Oversea-Chinese Banking Corporation (No.2 Overseas Chinese Bank)

Malaysia
Public Bank (No.4 Overseas Chinese Bank)
Hong Leong Bank (No.6 Overseas Chinese Bank)

Philippines
Banco de Oro Universal Bank
Philippine National Bank (No.12 Overseas Chinese Bank)
Metropolitan Bank and Trust Company (No.9 Overseas Chinese Bank)
Rizal Commercial Banking Corporation (No.14 Overseas Chinese Bank)
Chinabank (No.10 Overseas Chinese Bank)
Security Bank (No.13 Overseas Chinese Bank)
Philippine Savings Bank (No.15 Overseas Chinese Bank) (part of Metropolitan Bank and Trust Company)

Thailand
Bangkok Bank (No.5 Overseas Chinese Bank and No.1 Thai Bank)
Kasikorn Bank (No.7 Overseas Chinese Bank and No.3 Thai Bank)
Bank of Ayudhya (No.8 Overseas Chinese Bank)
Bank of Asia (Part of United Overseas Bank)
Radanasin Bank (Part of United Overseas Bank to be merged with Bank of Asia)

United States
In addition to Southeast Asia, the second location where most overseas Chinese banks are is the United States.  However, unlike Southeast Asia where Chinese play dominant roles in the local economy, the Chinese Americans’ share of the highly developed American economy is small and most overseas Chinese banks in the United States are privately held.

Strategy for survival
The oversea Chinese banks in the United States are hardly able to compete with the well established mainstream banks on equal terms and their assets are often far less than that of those well established mainstream banks. Therefore, most overseas Chinese banks in the United States adopted a different strategy than their Southeast Asian counterparts by serving a particular segment of the market. Most overseas Chinese banks are relatively small banks in terms of assets and they began as community banks catering to their local Chinese community in the United States. A few of the banks would later expand to the national level but most remain at the community level, tailoring to the specific needs of the local overseas Chinese, such as helping them to remit money back to China, to provide finance for import and export businesses, and real estate.

Distribution in the United States
Most overseas Chinese banks in the United States are concentrated in the western part of the country and in New York City mirroring the traditional population distribution of the Chinese Americans in the United States.
Recently, some overseas Chinese banks have begun to open offices in other parts of the country, following the newer Chinese immigration pattern.

List of Overseas Chinese Banks in the United States
*It is important to note that these banks are not controlled or influenced by the Chinese government. These banks are independently and privately owned, and cater to the Chinese and Asian populations of their respective countries.*

Abacus Federal Savings Bank
American First National Bank
American Continental Bank
American Plus Bank
American Premier Bank
Asia Bank N.A.
Asian Pacific National Bank
Asiana Capital
Bank of the Orient
California Business Bank
Cathay Bank
Chinatown Federal Savings Bank
Chinese American Bank
Concord Bank N.A.
Eastbank N.A.
East West Bank
EverTrust Bank
First American International Bank
First Choice Bank
First General Bank
GBC International Bank
Global Commerce Bank
Golden Bank
Golden Security Bank
Great Eastern Bank
Los Angeles National Bank
Mega Bank
MetroCorp Bancshares
Omni Bank (California)
Pacific Alliance Bank
Pacific Global Bank
Preferred Bank
Royal Business Bank
Southwestern National Bank
Tomato Bank
United Commercial Bank
United International Bank
United Orient Bank
United Pacific Bank
Universal Bank

Latin America
There is only one Overseas Chinese bank in the Latin American region.

Costa Rica
Banco Cathay de Costa Rica

References

Banks
Banks